Arand (also Romanized as Ārand; also known as Aran) is a village in Kuhestan Rural District, in the Central District of Nain County, Isfahan Province, Iran. At the 2006 census, its population was 50, in 16 families.

References 

Populated places in Nain County